The 1980 Pittsburgh Pirates season was the 99th season of the Pittsburgh Pirates franchise; the 94th in the National League. The Pirates finished third in the National League East with a record of 83–79.

Regular season

Season standings

Record vs. opponents

Game log

|- bgcolor="ffbbbb"
| 1 || April 10 || @ Cardinals || 0–1 || Vuckovich || Blyleven (0–1) || — || 42,867 || 0–1
|- bgcolor="ccffcc"
| 2 || April 11 || @ Cardinals || 4–3 || Jackson (1–0) || Hood || — || 16,998 || 1–1
|- bgcolor="ccffcc"
| 3 || April 12 || @ Cardinals || 7–2 || Bibby (1–0) || Fulgham || — || 15,662 || 2–1
|- bgcolor="ccffcc"
| 4 || April 13 || @ Cardinals || 3–0 || Rooker (1–0) || Martinez || Jackson (1) || 16,301 || 3–1
|- bgcolor="ccffcc"
| 5 || April 14 || Cubs || 5–4 (10) || Tekulve (1–0) || Sutter || — || 44,088 || 4–1
|- bgcolor="ffbbbb"
| 6 || April 17 || Cardinals || 9–12 || Sykes || Candelaria (0–1) || — || 5,233 || 4–2
|- bgcolor="ccffcc"
| 7 || April 18 || Cardinals || 12–10 || Jackson (2–0) || Knowles || Tekulve (1) || 10,196 || 5–2
|- bgcolor="ffbbbb"
| 8 || April 19 || Cardinals || 1–2 || Fulgham || Roberts (0–1) || — || 12,642 || 5–3
|- bgcolor="ccffcc"
| 9 || April 20 || Cardinals || 6–3 || Rooker (2–0) || Vuckovich || Tekulve (2) || 35,567 || 6–3
|- bgcolor="ccffcc"
| 10 || April 21 || @ Expos || 7–1 || Candelaria (1–1) || Grimsley || — || 10,327 || 7–3
|- bgcolor="ccffcc"
| 11 || April 22 || @ Expos || 5–3 || Bibby (2–0) || Sanderson || Tekulve (3) || 7,373 || 8–3
|- bgcolor="ffbbbb"
| 12 || April 23 || @ Expos || 2–3 || Rogers || Blyleven (0–2) || — || 8,161 || 8–4
|- bgcolor="ffbbbb"
| 13 || April 25 || @ Cubs || 3–5 || Reuschel || Rooker (2–1) || Sutter || 7,714 || 8–5
|- bgcolor="ccffcc"
| 14 || April 26 || @ Cubs || 9–2 || Candelaria (2–1) || Lamp || — || 32,992 || 9–5
|- bgcolor="ccffcc"
| 15 || April 29 || Expos || 5–4 (10) || Solomon (1–0) || Sosa || — || 8,498 || 10–5
|- bgcolor="ccffcc"
| 16 || April 30 || Expos || 5–0 || Bibby (3–0) || Lee || — || 8,545 || 11–5
|-

|- bgcolor="ccffcc"
| 17 || May 1 || Expos || 2–1 (10) || Tekulve (2–0) || Fryman || — || 8,426 || 12–5
|- bgcolor="ffbbbb"
| 18 || May 2 || Braves || 1–6 || Niekro || Rooker (2–2) || — || 11,476 || 12–6
|- bgcolor="ffbbbb"
| 19 || May 3 || Braves || 1–3 (10) || Hrabosky || Jackson (2–1) || — || 34,104 || 12–7
|- bgcolor="ccffcc"
| 20 || May 4 || Braves || 13–4 || Bibby (4–0) || Boggs || — || 14,358 || 13–7
|- bgcolor="ccffcc"
| 21 || May 6 || Dodgers || 2–1 || Tekulve (3–0) || Howe || — || 9,817 || 14–7
|- bgcolor="ccffcc"
| 22 || May 7 || Dodgers || 7–6 || Tekulve (4–0) || Hough || — || 11,404 || 15–7
|- bgcolor="ccffcc"
| 23 || May 9 || @ Padres || 4–3 || Tekulve (5–0) || Fingers || — || 34,078 || 16–7
|- bgcolor="ccffcc"
| 24 || May 10 || @ Padres || 9–5 || Robinson (1–0) || Rasmussen || Romo (1) || 18,168 || 17–7
|- bgcolor="ffbbbb"
| 25 || May 11 || @ Padres || 0–5 || Jones || Candelaria (2–2) || — || 22,522 || 17–8
|- bgcolor="ffbbbb"
| 26 || May 13 || @ Giants || 0–5 || Blue || Blyleven (0–3) || — || 13,798 || 17–9
|- bgcolor="ccffcc"
| 27 || May 14 || @ Giants || 3–2 || Bibby (5–0) || Knepper || Tekulve (4) || 8,734 || 18–9
|- bgcolor="ccffcc"
| 28 || May 15 || @ Giants || 3–2 (12) || Romo (1–0) || Griffin || — || 7,781 || 19–9
|- bgcolor="ffbbbb"
| 29 || May 16 || @ Dodgers || 6–8 || Reuss || Tekulve (5–1) || Sutcliffe || 47,929 || 19–10
|- bgcolor="ffbbbb"
| 30 || May 17 || @ Dodgers || 1–3 || Sutton || Blyleven (0–4) || Howe || 50,082 || 19–11
|- bgcolor="ffbbbb"
| 31 || May 18 || @ Dodgers || 0–2 || Welch || Bibby (5–1) || Howe || 49,867 || 19–12
|- bgcolor="ccffcc"
| 32 || May 21 || Padres || 4–3 || Romo (2–0) || Fingers || — ||  || 20–12
|- bgcolor="ccffcc"
| 33 || May 21 || Padres || 3–2 || Jackson (3–1) || Curtis || Tekulve (5) || 17,301 || 21–12
|- bgcolor="ffbbbb"
| 34 || May 22 || Padres || 4–6 || Shirley || Tekulve (5–2) || Fingers || 12,496 || 21–13
|- bgcolor="ccffcc"
| 35 || May 23 || Giants || 5–4 (13) || Jackson (4–1) || Holland || — || 9,619 || 22–13
|- bgcolor="ffbbbb"
| 36 || May 24 || Giants || 9–10 (15) || Griffin || Scurry (0–1) || — || 11,591 || 22–14
|- bgcolor="ffbbbb"
| 37 || May 25 || Giants || 2–5 || Blue || Candelaria (2–3) || — || 42,626 || 22–15
|- bgcolor="ffbbbb"
| 38 || May 26 || @ Phillies || 6–7 || Reed || Tekulve (5–3) || — || 45,394 || 22–16
|- bgcolor="ccffcc"
| 39 || May 27 || @ Phillies || 3–2 (13) || Romo (3–0) || Noles || Tekulve (6) || 35,989 || 23–16
|- bgcolor="ffbbbb"
| 40 || May 28 || @ Phillies || 3–6 || Lerch || Robinson (1–1) || Reed || 30,209 || 23–17
|- bgcolor="ccffcc"
| 41 || May 29 || @ Phillies || 5–4 || Solomon (2–0) || Ruthven || Romo (2) || 30,630 || 24–17
|- bgcolor="ffbbbb"
| 42 || May 30 || Mets || 1–5 (6) || Zachry || Candelaria (2–4) || — || 17,101 || 24–18
|- bgcolor="ccffcc"
| 43 || May 31 || Mets || 5–0 || Blyleven (1–4) || Swan || — || 13,901 || 25–18
|-

|- bgcolor="ccffcc"
| 44 || June 1 || Mets || 13–3 || Bibby (6–1) || Falcone || — || 49,626 || 26–18
|- bgcolor="ccffcc"
| 45 || June 2 || Phillies || 9–3 || Robinson (2–1) || Lerch || — || 19,990 || 27–18
|- bgcolor="ccffcc"
| 46 || June 3 || Phillies || 4–3 || Jackson (5–1) || McGraw || — || 22,141 || 28–18
|- bgcolor="ffbbbb"
| 47 || June 4 || Phillies || 3–4 || Carlton || Candelaria (2–5) || — || 31,075 || 28–19
|- bgcolor="ffbbbb"
| 48 || June 6 || @ Mets || 4–9 || Hausman || Blyleven (1–5) || — || 18,352 || 28–20
|- bgcolor="ffbbbb"
| 49 || June 7 || @ Mets || 5–6 (11) || Allen || Jackson (5–2) || — || 13,509 || 28–21
|- bgcolor="ffbbbb"
| 50 || June 8 || @ Mets || 4–6 || Burris || Romo (3–1) || Glynn ||  || 28–22
|- bgcolor="ccffcc"
| 51 || June 8 || @ Mets || 3–0 || Solomon (3–0) || Bomback || Tekulve (7) || 29,329 || 29–22
|- bgcolor="ccffcc"
| 52 || June 10 || @ Reds || 5–3 || Candelaria (3–5) || Soto || Tekulve (8) || 26,648 || 30–22
|- bgcolor="ffbbbb"
| 53 || June 11 || @ Reds || 2–3 || Pastore || Blyleven (1–6) || — || 29,211 || 30–23
|- bgcolor="ccffcc"
| 54 || June 12 || @ Reds || 10–6 || Bibby (7–1) || LaCoss || Romo (3) || 31,557 || 31–23
|- bgcolor="ccffcc"
| 55 || June 13 || Astros || 5–3 || Solomon (4–0) || Niekro || Tekulve (9) || 31,854 || 32–23
|- bgcolor="ffbbbb"
| 56 || June 14 || Astros || 3–7 || Ryan || Robinson (2–2) || LaCorte || 33,922 || 32–24
|- bgcolor="ccffcc"
| 57 || June 15 || Astros || 4–1 || Candelaria (4–5) || Forsch || — || 49,541 || 33–24
|- bgcolor="ccffcc"
| 58 || June 16 || Reds || 5–3 || Blyleven (2–6) || Pastore || Jackson (2) || 19,940 || 34–24
|- bgcolor="ffbbbb"
| 59 || June 17 || Reds || 3–4 || Moskau || Romo (3–2) || — || 25,565 || 34–25
|- bgcolor="ffbbbb"
| 60 || June 18 || @ Braves || 2–3 || Garber || Tekulve (5–4) || — ||  || 34–26
|- bgcolor="ffbbbb"
| 61 || June 18 || @ Braves || 4–5 || Camp || Romo (3–3) || Garber || 17,154 || 34–27
|- bgcolor="ffbbbb"
| 62 || June 19 || @ Braves || 3–4 || Matula || Robinson (2–3) || Bradford || 10,585 || 34–28
|- bgcolor="ffbbbb"
| 63 || June 20 || @ Astros || 4–6 || Forsch || Candelaria (4–6) || Sambito || 35,955 || 34–29
|- bgcolor="ffbbbb"
| 64 || June 21 || @ Astros || 2–4 || Ruhle || Blyleven (2–7) || Sambito || 45,867 || 34–30
|- bgcolor="ccffcc"
| 65 || June 22 || @ Astros || 2–1 || Bibby (8–1) || Niekro || Jackson (3) || 46,213 || 35–30
|- bgcolor="ffbbbb"
| 66 || June 23 || @ Cardinals || 1–6 || Kaat || Solomon (4–1) || — || 20,422 || 35–31
|- bgcolor="ffbbbb"
| 67 || June 24 || @ Cardinals || 2–3 || Sykes || Rhoden (0–1) || — || 21,858 || 35–32
|- bgcolor="ffbbbb"
| 68 || June 25 || @ Cardinals || 1–4 || Hood || Candelaria (4–7) || Seaman || 26,102 || 35–33
|- bgcolor="ccffcc"
| 69 || June 27 || @ Expos || 6–4 || Romo (4–3) || Rogers || Robinson (1) || 44,232 || 36–33
|- bgcolor="ccffcc"
| 70 || June 28 || @ Expos || 4–3 || Bibby (9–1) || Lea || Romo (4) || 38,065 || 37–33
|- bgcolor="ffbbbb"
| 71 || June 29 || @ Expos || 1–4 || Palmer || Solomon (4–2) || Norman || 46,186 || 37–34
|- bgcolor="ccffcc"
| 72 || June 30 || Cardinals || 5–4 || Romo (5–3) || Hood || — || 16,591 || 38–34
|-

|- bgcolor="ccffcc"
| 73 || July 1 || Cardinals || 3–2 (10) || Jackson (6–2) || Kaat || — || 17,006 || 39–34
|- bgcolor="ffbbbb"
| 74 || July 2 || Cardinals || 5–7 (11) || Urrea || Scurry (0–2) || — || 15,250 || 39–35
|- bgcolor="ccffcc"
| 75 || July 3 || Cubs || 5–3 || Bibby (10–1) || Krukow || Jackson (4) || 14,062 || 40–35
|- bgcolor="ffbbbb"
| 76 || July 4 || Cubs || 2–4 || McGlothen || Solomon (4–3) || Sutter ||  || 40–36
|- bgcolor="ffbbbb"
| 77 || July 4 || Cubs || 1–2 || Capilla || Robinson (2–4) || Tidrow || 24,668 || 40–37
|- bgcolor="ccffcc"
| 78 || July 5 || Cubs || 5–4 || Candelaria (5–7) || Hernandez || Romo (5) || 46,372 || 41–37
|- bgcolor="ccffcc"
| 79 || July 6 || Cubs || 5–4 (20) || Bibby (11–1) || Lamp || — || 25,994 || 42–37
|- bgcolor="ffbbbb"
| 80 || July 10 || @ Mets || 0–2 || Zachry || Candelaria (5–8) || — || 21,540 || 42–38
|- bgcolor="ccffcc"
| 81 || July 11 || @ Mets || 4–2 || Blyleven (3–7) || Swan || Tekulve (10) || 30,907 || 43–38
|- bgcolor="ffbbbb"
| 82 || July 12 || @ Phillies || 4–5 || Saucier || Tekulve (5–5) || — || 53,254 || 43–39
|- bgcolor="ccffcc"
| 83 || July 13 || @ Phillies || 7–3 || Robinson (3–4) || Espinosa || Tekulve (11) || 48,132 || 44–39
|- bgcolor="ccffcc"
| 84 || July 14 || @ Phillies || 13–11 || Jackson (7–2) || Reed || — || 44,245 || 45–39
|- bgcolor="ccffcc"
| 85 || July 15 || Giants || 5–2 || Candelaria (6–8) || Knepper || Tekulve (12) || 17,114 || 46–39
|- bgcolor="ccffcc"
| 86 || July 16 || Giants || 3–1 || Blyleven (4–7) || Whitson || Jackson (5) || 18,226 || 47–39
|- bgcolor="ccffcc"
| 87 || July 17 || Giants || 3–2 || Tekulve (6–5) || Holland || — || 25,508 || 48–39
|- bgcolor="ccffcc"
| 88 || July 18 || Dodgers || 6–4 || Rhoden (1–1) || Welch || Romo (6) || 30,131 || 49–39
|- bgcolor="ccffcc"
| 89 || July 19 || Dodgers || 7–3 || Solomon (5–3) || Sutcliffe || — || 28,731 || 50–39
|- bgcolor="ffbbbb"
| 90 || July 20 || Dodgers || 2–4 || Hooton || Candelaria (6–9) || Howe ||  || 50–40
|- bgcolor="ccffcc"
| 91 || July 20 || Dodgers || 8–7 || Jackson (8–2) || Castillo || — || 41,932 || 51–40
|- bgcolor="ccffcc"
| 92 || July 22 || @ Padres || 4–3 || Bibby (12–1) || Lucas || Tekulve (13) || 17,504 || 52–40
|- bgcolor="ffbbbb"
| 93 || July 23 || @ Padres || 2–3 || Fingers || Romo (5–4) || — || 14,608 || 52–41
|- bgcolor="ccffcc"
| 94 || July 24 || @ Padres || 7–1 || Blyleven (5–7) || Shirley || — || 15,746 || 53–41
|- bgcolor="ccffcc"
| 95 || July 25 || @ Giants || 5–1 || Candelaria (7–9) || Knepper || — || 22,830 || 54–41
|- bgcolor="ffbbbb"
| 96 || July 26 || @ Giants || 3–4 (10) || Minton || Jackson (8–3) || — || 28,566 || 54–42
|- bgcolor="ccffcc"
| 97 || July 27 || @ Giants || 6–4 || Bibby (13–1) || Bordley || Tekulve (14) || 31,186 || 55–42
|- bgcolor="ccffcc"
| 98 || July 28 || @ Dodgers || 6–4 || Rhoden (2–1) || Welch || Tekulve (15) || 46,973 || 56–42
|- bgcolor="ffbbbb"
| 99 || July 29 || @ Dodgers || 2–10 || Hooton || Blyleven (5–8) || — || 47,013 || 56–43
|- bgcolor="ffbbbb"
| 100 || July 30 || @ Dodgers || 0–3 || Reuss || Candelaria (7–10) || — || 50,308 || 56–44
|-

|- bgcolor="ffbbbb"
| 101 || August 1 || Padres || 0–1 || Mura || Bibby (13–2) || Fingers || 22,304 || 56–45
|- bgcolor="ffbbbb"
| 102 || August 3 || Padres || 2–5 || Curtis || Rhoden (2–2) || — ||  || 56–46
|- bgcolor="ffbbbb"
| 103 || August 3 || Padres || 1–4 || Shirley || Robinson (3–5) || Fingers || 20,517 || 56–47
|- bgcolor="ffbbbb"
| 104 || August 5 || @ Cubs || 3–11 || Reuschel || Candelaria (7–11) || — || 22,939 || 56–48
|- bgcolor="ccffcc"
| 105 || August 6 || @ Cubs || 9–7 || Tekulve (7–5) || Tidrow || Romo (7) ||  || 57–48
|- bgcolor="ccffcc"
| 106 || August 6 || @ Cubs || 2–0 || Blyleven (6–8) || Capilla || Jackson (6) || 24,305 || 58–48
|- bgcolor="ccffcc"
| 107 || August 7 || @ Cubs || 11–3 || Solomon (6–3) || Hernandez || — || 28,364 || 59–48
|- bgcolor="ccffcc"
| 108 || August 8 || Phillies || 6–5 || Tekulve (8–5) || McGraw || Romo (8) || 30,354 || 60–48
|- bgcolor="ccffcc"
| 109 || August 9 || Phillies || 4–1 || Candelaria (8–11) || Espinosa || Tekulve (16) || 39,984 || 61–48
|- bgcolor="ccffcc"
| 110 || August 10 || Phillies || 7–1 || Bibby (14–2) || Lerch || — ||  || 62–48
|- bgcolor="ccffcc"
| 111 || August 10 || Phillies || 4–1 || Robinson (4–5) || Larson || Tekulve (17) || 37,323 || 63–48
|- bgcolor="ccffcc"
| 112 || August 11 || Mets || 2–1 (6) || Solomon (7–3) || Jackson || — || 13,790 || 64–48
|- bgcolor="ffbbbb"
| 113 || August 12 || Mets || 1–3 || Burris || Rhoden (2–3) || Allen || 18,754 || 64–49
|- bgcolor="ffbbbb"
| 114 || August 13 || Mets || 3–5 || Hausman || Candelaria (8–12) || Reardon || 19,514 || 64–50
|- bgcolor="ccffcc"
| 115 || August 15 || Expos || 7–3 || Bibby (15–2) || Rogers || Tekulve (18) || 29,721 || 65–50
|- bgcolor="ccffcc"
| 116 || August 16 || Expos || 5–0 || Blyleven (7–8) || Sanderson || — || 32,390 || 66–50
|- bgcolor="ccffcc"
| 117 || August 17 || Expos || 5–1 || Rhoden (3–3) || Norman || — ||  || 67–50
|- bgcolor="ffbbbb"
| 118 || August 17 || Expos || 2–4 || Gullickson || Robinson (4–6) || Fryman || 49,412 || 67–51
|- bgcolor="ffbbbb"
| 119 || August 19 || @ Astros || 2–5 || Ryan || Candelaria (8–13) || Sambito || 39,415 || 67–52
|- bgcolor="ffbbbb"
| 120 || August 20 || @ Astros || 1–5 || Ruhle || Bibby (15–3) || Smith || 32,112 || 67–53
|- bgcolor="ffbbbb"
| 121 || August 21 || @ Astros || 5–12 || Sambito || Blyleven (7–9) || — || 33,884 || 67–54
|- bgcolor="ccffcc"
| 122 || August 22 || @ Reds || 4–2 || Robinson (5–6) || Moskau || Tekulve (19) || 37,936 || 68–54
|- bgcolor="ccffcc"
| 123 || August 23 || @ Reds || 2–1 || Rhoden (4–3) || Pastore || Jackson (7) || 43,482 || 69–54
|- bgcolor="ccffcc"
| 124 || August 24 || @ Reds || 5–2 || Candelaria (9–13) || LaCoss || — || 37,072 || 70–54
|- bgcolor="ffbbbb"
| 125 || August 25 || Braves || 6–8 || Hanna || Bibby (15–4) || Bradford || 15,657 || 70–55
|- bgcolor="ffbbbb"
| 126 || August 26 || Braves || 2–4 (10) || Garber || Tekulve (8–6) || — || 14,695 || 70–56
|- bgcolor="ffbbbb"
| 127 || August 27 || Braves || 4–7 || Matula || Robinson (5–7) || Hrabosky || 12,363 || 70–57
|- bgcolor="ffbbbb"
| 128 || August 28 || Reds || 0–4 || Moskau || Rhoden (4–4) || — || 17,406 || 70–58
|- bgcolor="ffbbbb"
| 129 || August 29 || Reds || 7–8 || Soto || Tekulve (8–7) || Hume || 41,494 || 70–59
|- bgcolor="ffbbbb"
| 130 || August 30 || Reds || 3–5 || Seaver || Bibby (15–5) || — || 24,493 || 70–60
|- bgcolor="ffbbbb"
| 131 || August 31 || Reds || 4–5 || LaCoss || Blyleven (7–10) || Soto || 21,774 || 70–61
|-

|- bgcolor="ffbbbb"
| 132 || September 1 || Astros || 4–10 || Smith || Robinson (5–8) || — ||  || 70–62
|- bgcolor="ccffcc"
| 133 || September 1 || Astros || 7–5 || Rhoden (5–4) || Pladson || Jackson (8) || 26,374 || 71–62
|- bgcolor="ccffcc"
| 134 || September 3 || Astros || 10–4 || Candelaria (10–13) || Andujar || Romo (9) || 18,502 || 72–62
|- bgcolor="ffbbbb"
| 135 || September 5 || @ Braves || 4–7 || Camp || Tekulve (8–8) || — || 29,610 || 72–63
|- bgcolor="ffbbbb"
| 136 || September 6 || @ Braves || 2–3 || Niekro || Blyleven (7–11) || Garber || 17,821 || 72–64
|- bgcolor="ffbbbb"
| 137 || September 7 || @ Braves || 5–6 || Bradford || Tekulve (8–9) || Camp || 19,762 || 72–65
|- bgcolor="ffbbbb"
| 138 || September 8 || @ Phillies || 2–6 || McGraw || Romo (5–5) || — || 40,576 || 72–66
|- bgcolor="ffbbbb"
| 139 || September 9 || @ Phillies || 4–5 (14) || Brusstar || Lee (0–1) || — || 43,333 || 72–67
|- bgcolor="ccffcc"
| 140 || September 10 || @ Cardinals || 7–6 || Bibby (16–5) || Hood || Romo (10) || 10,300 || 73–67
|- bgcolor="ccffcc"
| 141 || September 11 || @ Cardinals || 2–1 || Blyleven (8–11) || Martin || — || 7,521 || 74–67
|- bgcolor="ffbbbb"
| 142 || September 12 || @ Expos || 0–1 || Sanderson || Rhoden (5–5) || — || 36,992 || 74–68
|- bgcolor="ccffcc"
| 143 || September 13 || @ Expos || 4–0 || Robinson (6–8) || Rogers || — || 51,305 || 75–68
|- bgcolor="ffbbbb"
| 144 || September 14 || @ Expos || 0–4 || Gullickson || Candelaria (10–14) || — || 56,137 || 75–69
|- bgcolor="ccffcc"
| 145 || September 16 || Phillies || 3–2 || Bibby (17–5) || Ruthven || Tekulve (20) || 22,239 || 76–69
|- bgcolor="ffbbbb"
| 146 || September 17 || Phillies || 4–5 (11) || McGraw || Tekulve (8–10) || Lyle || 23,650 || 76–70
|- bgcolor="ccffcc"
| 147 || September 19 || Mets || 4–3 || Rhoden (6–5) || Lynch || — || 17,593 || 77–70
|- bgcolor="ffbbbb"
| 148 || September 20 || Mets || 6–9 (11) || Allen || Tekulve (8–11) || Miller || 22,084 || 77–71
|- bgcolor="ccffcc"
| 149 || September 21 || Mets || 9–4 || Candelaria (11–14) || Burris || — || 20,320 || 78–71
|- bgcolor="ccffcc"
| 150 || September 22 || Expos || 4–2 || Bibby (18–5) || Sanderson || Tekulve (21) || 18,416 || 79–71
|- bgcolor="ffbbbb"
| 151 || September 23 || Expos || 1–7 || Rogers || Blyleven (8–12) || — || 26,729 || 79–72
|- bgcolor="ccffcc"
| 152 || September 24 || Cardinals || 6–3 || Rhoden (7–5) || Martin || Jackson (9) || 4,297 || 80–72
|- bgcolor="ffbbbb"
| 153 || September 25 || Cardinals || 2–10 || Kaat || Robinson (6–9) || — || 6,805 || 80–73
|- bgcolor="ffbbbb"
| 154 || September 26 || @ Cubs || 8–9 || Caudill || Tekulve (8–12) || — || 3,941 || 80–74
|- bgcolor="ffbbbb"
| 155 || September 27 || @ Cubs || 0–2 || Martz || Bibby (18–6) || Tidrow || 15,565 || 80–75
|- bgcolor="ffbbbb"
| 156 || September 28 || @ Cubs || 2–3 || Krukow || Blyleven (8–13) || Caudill || 10,305 || 80–76
|- bgcolor="ffbbbb"
| 157 || September 29 || ="@ "Mets || 4–5 (10) || Reardon || Jackson (8–4) || — || 1,787 || 80–77
|- bgcolor="ffbbbb"
| 158 || September 30 || @ Mets || 2–3 || Falcone || Robinson (6–10) || — || 1,754 || 80–78
|-

|- bgcolor="ccffcc"
| 159 || October 1 || @ Mets || 10–5 || Bibby (19–6) || Burris || Romo (11) || 2,392 || 81–78
|- bgcolor="ccffcc"
| 160 || October 3 || Cubs || 3–1 || Jefferson (1–0) || Reuschel || Candelaria (1) || 5,270 || 82–78
|- bgcolor="ffbbbb"
| 161 || October 4 || Cubs || 0–6 || McGlothen || Perez (0–1) || — || 2,717 || 82–79
|- bgcolor="ccffcc"
| 162 || October 5 || Cubs || 1–0 || Robinson (7–10) || Capilla || — || 20,588 || 83–79
|-

|-
| Legend:       = Win       = LossBold = Pirates team member

Roster

Opening Day Lineup

Player stats
Batting
Note: G = Games played; AB = At bats; H = Hits; Avg. = Batting average; HR = Home runs; RBI = Runs batted in

Pitching
Note: G = Games pitched; IP = Innings pitched; W = Wins; L = Losses; ERA = Earned run average; SO = Strikeouts

Awards and honors

All-Stars 
1980 Major League Baseball All-Star Game
Dave Parker, starter, outfield
Jim Bibby, reserve
Phil Garner, reserve
Kent Tekulve, reserve

Transactions 
November 1, 1979 – Dock Ellis granted free agency.
November 1, 1979 – Bruce Kison granted free agency.
November 1, 1979 – Rennie Stennett granted free agency.
November 21, 1979 – Signed Andy Hassler as a free agent.
November 24, 1979 – Signed Cecilio Guante as an amateur free agent.
December 21, 1979 – Traded John Burden (minors) and Larry Littleton to the Cleveland Indians. Received Larry Andersen.
January 11, 1980 – Drafted Keith Creel in the 1st round (6th pick) of the 1980 amateur draft (January Secondary), but did not sign the player.
January 11, 1980 – Drafted Tom Nieto in the 3rd round of the 1980 amateur draft (January Secondary), but did not sign the player.
January 11, 1980 – Drafted Bill Bathe in the 10th round of the 1980 amateur draft (January), but did not sign the player.
March 28, 1980 – Traded a player to be named later to the Atlanta Braves. Received Eddie Solomon. The Pittsburgh Pirates sent Greg Field (minors) (April 25, 1980) to the Atlanta Braves to complete the trade.
April 1, 1980 – Traded a player to be named later and cash to the Seattle Mariners. Received Odell Jones. The Pittsburgh Pirates sent Larry Andersen (October 29, 1980) to the Seattle Mariners to complete the trade.
April 5, 1980 – Signed Dale Mohorcic as a free agent.
April 10, 1980 – Signed Mickey Mahler as a free agent.
April 24, 1980 – Sold Dave Roberts to the Seattle Mariners.
May 16, 1980 – Signed Ramon Pena as an amateur free agent.
June 3, 1980 – Drafted Rick Renteria in the 1st round (20th pick) of the 1980 amateur draft.
June 3, 1980 – Drafted Tim Burke in the 2nd round of the 1980 amateur draft.
June 3, 1980 – Drafted Joe Orsulak in the 6th round of the 1980 amateur draft. Player signed August 20, 1980.
June 10, 1980 – Sold Andy Hassler to the California Angels.
June 23, 1980 – Signed Trench Davis as an amateur free agent.
July 10, 1980 – Signed Rafael Belliard as an amateur free agent.
July 16, 1980 – Traded Jerry McDonald (minors) to the Atlanta Braves. Received Bob Beall.
August 5, 1980 – Traded Rick Lancellotti and Luis Salazar to the San Diego Padres. Received a player to be named later and Kurt Bevacqua. The San Diego Padres sent Mark Lee (August 12, 1980) to the Pittsburgh Pirates to complete the trade.
August 20, 1980 – Released Alberto Lois.
August 21, 1980 – Signed Ravelo Manzanillo as an amateur free agent.
September 1, 1980 – Signed Bernie Carbo as a free agent.
September 11, 1980 – Selected Jesse Jefferson off waivers from the Toronto Blue Jays.
October 8, 1980 – Released Bernie Carbo.
October 10, 1980 – Released Jim Rooker.
October 21, 1980 – Released Gene Pentz.

Farm system

Notes

References 
 1980 Pittsburgh Pirates at Baseball Reference
 1980 Pittsburgh Pirates at Baseball Almanac

Pittsburgh Pirates seasons
Pittsburgh Pirates season
Pitts